Larco Avenue is a major avenue in the district of Miraflores, an affluent district in Lima, Peru. 

It originates at the Óvalo de Miraflores, a roundabout in the center of the district, and runs south, towards Avenida Armendariz and the pier. It is primarily an affluent commercial street, home to various boutiques, casinos, luxury hotels, bars, and nightclubs. It is the setting of numerous works of literature that depict Lima's social elite and provides historical context to Lima's upper classes, among them works by Alfredo Bryce and Nobel laureate Mario Vargas Llosa. 

Among the most important locations on this street are: the Hilton and Marriott hotels; the municipal palace of Miraflores, home of the Mayor of Miraflores; the Sala Luis Miró Quesada Garland, a major art gallery; the Parquemar tower, among the tallest buildings in Peru and home to the Dutch, British, and Israeli embassies; and, the Larcomar shopping mall.

Larco
Geography of Lima